Col. Max G. Johl (October 26, 1900 – March 31, 1957) of Connecticut, was an American philatelist who specialized in the collecting of, and writing philatelic literature on, United States postage stamps.

Collecting interests
Johl’s stamp collecting interests consisted of 20th Century postage stamps of the United States. Along with Beverly Sedgwick King, he co-authored “United States Postage Stamps of the Twentieth Century” (Vol. 1, 1932; Vol. 2, 1934).

Co-author Beverly King died in 1935, and Johl continued the work on “United States Postage Stamps of the Twentieth Century” and completed volume 3 in 1935 and volume 4 in 1938. He revised and enlarged volume 1 in 1937.

In 1947 he published his work “The United States Commemorative Stamps of the Twentieth Century, 1902-1947”  in two volumes.

Philatelic activity
Johl served as an officer at the Collectors Club of New York and was an officer and judge at CIPEX (Centenary International Philatelic Exhibition) in 1947.

Honors and awards
Johl received numerous awards and honors including the Crawford Medal from the Royal Philatelic Society, London, as well as the Luff Award in 1950 and, in 1957, he signed the Roll of Distinguished Philatelists. He was named to the American Philatelic Society Hall of Fame in 1957.

See also
 Philately
 Philatelic literature

References
 Max G. Johl

1900 births
1957 deaths
Philatelic literature
American philatelists
People from Connecticut
Signatories to the Roll of Distinguished Philatelists
American Philatelic Society